Azmeer bin Yusof (born 25 May 1990) is a retired Malaysian professional footballer who plays for Malaysia Super League side Kedah as a left back. He played with Kelana United in the Subang Football League.

Club career
Azmeer has played with Kuala Lumpur and Proton before signing with Perak in 2010. He later was released by Perak at the end of 2011 season.

For the 2012 season, Azmeer signed with Pos Malaysia. He joined Negeri Sembilan on a three-month loan in August 2012 for the 2012 Malaysia Cup campaign. He later signed with Negeri Sembilan permanently for the 2013 Malaysia Super League season. After only a season with Negeri Sembilan, he returned to Perak FA for the 2014 Malaysia Super League season.

Azmeer later signed with ATM for 2015 season before moved to Kedah in 2016. He signed with an amateur side Kelana United for the 2021 season. Kelana United played in the Subang Football League alongside Najmi Football.

Career statistics

Club

Honours
Kedah
Malaysia Cup: 2016
 Malaysia FA Cup: 2019

Kuala Lumpur
Malaysia Premier League: 2017

References

External links
 Profile and Stats at Opera Sports
 Berkenalan dengan Pemain Pasukan Perak (Part 1)

1990 births
Living people
Malaysian footballers
Perak F.C. players
Kuala Lumpur City F.C. players
Negeri Sembilan FA players
ATM FA players
People from Perak
Malaysia Super League players
Association football defenders
Malaysian people of Malay descent